Kosinj Bridge is a  stone bridge in Kosinj region in Lika, Croatia. It connects the villages Gornji Kosinj and Donji Kosinj. It was designed in the 20th century by Milivoj Frković, and was modelled on the old Croatian bridge-building technique of stone clipping. The bridge features piers designed to reduce or eliminate scour damage. Not only does this design help relieve the impact of waves on the bride, but it creates symmetrical circles in the water.

The construction of the bridge began in 1929. In 1936, it was opened to traffic.

References

Ivan Mance: Kosinj izvorište hrvatske tiskane riječi, Split, 2013.

https://kosinj-konzalting.hr/kosinjski-most/

Bridges in Croatia
Bridges completed in 1936
Buildings and structures in Lika-Senj County